Planctogystia gaedei is a moth of the family Cossidae. It is found in northern Madagascar.
The name of this species is a replacement name for a species described in 1930 by Max Gaede, Cossus fuscibasis.

See also
 List of moths of Madagascar

References

Cossinae
Moths described in 1990
Moths of Madagascar
Moths of Africa